Margherita Panziera (born 12 August 1995) is an Italian swimmer. She competed at the 2020 Summer Olympics, in 100 m backstroke and 200 m backstroke. She is also a three-time European Champion in the 200 metre backstroke, winning in 2018, 2021, and 2022.

Career
In 2015, at the World Championships in Kazan, in the 200 m backstroke competition, she took 10th place, with a time of 2:09.5. A year later, during the Olympic Games in Rio de Janeiro, in 200 m backstroke, she took 17th place with a time of 2:10.92. In July 2017, at the 200 m World Championships in Budapest, the backstroke was the fourteenth (2:10.95). In the eliminations of 100 m, backstroke, she achieved the time 1:01.03 and took 20th place, not qualifying for the semi-finals. In December of the same year, during the European Championships at the short course (25 m) in Copenhagen, she won the bronze medal over the distance of 200 m backstroke and set a new record for Italy with time 2:02.43. 

In August 2018, at the European Championships in Glasgow, she won the 200 m backstroke competition, with a time of 2: 06.18 minutes. Panziera improved both the records of the championship and her country. In a distance twice as short, she took fifth place (59.71). In 2020 she qualified to represent Italy at the 2020 Summer Olympics. At the 2021 European Aquatics Championships she won five medals, a gold, two silver and two bronze.

At the 2022 European Aquatics Championships, held in Rome in August, Panziera won the gold medal in the 200 metre backstroke with a time of 2:07.13. Four days later, with a time of 59.40 seconds, she won the gold medal in the 100 metre backstroke.

National records
Individual long course
 100 m backstroke: 58.92 (Riccione, Italy, 4 April 2019) - current holder
 200 m backstroke: 2:05.56 (Riccione, Italy, 31 March 2021) - current holder

Achievements

See also
 Italy national swimming team – Women multiple medalists
 List of Italian records in swimming

Notes

References

External links
 

1995 births
Living people
Italian female swimmers
Italian female backstroke swimmers
Olympic swimmers of Italy
Swimmers at the 2016 Summer Olympics
Swimmers at the 2020 Summer Olympics
Mediterranean Games medalists in swimming
Mediterranean Games gold medalists for Italy
Swimmers at the 2018 Mediterranean Games
European Aquatics Championships medalists in swimming
European Championships (multi-sport event) gold medalists
Swimmers of Fiamme Oro
Sportspeople from the Province of Treviso
21st-century Italian women
People from Montebelluna